Lanzhou University of Technology is a scientific and technological university located in Lanzhou, the provincial capital of Gansu Province, China.

History 
Lanzhou University of Technology was established as Ganzhou Technical School in 1919. In 1958, the school was renamed to Lanzhou Polytechnic Institute. In the same year, it merged with Gansu Communication College and changed its name to Gansu University of Technology. In 1965, the university broadened its curriculum when three specialties from Northeast Heavy-Machine Building Institute, and one specialty from Beijing Machine-Building Institute became a part of the university. The above specialties were a part of First Machine-Building Industry Ministry of China prior to transfer. Subsequent to the reorganization of the State Council of China in 1998, the university is administered by the provincial government and central government. The university was renamed Lanzhou University of Technology in May 2003 following approval by the Education Ministry of China.

Location 
The school is located in Qilihe District in Lanzhou city, the capital of Gansu Province. It has two campuses with a land mass area of 2430 acres and building area of 2,220,000 m2.

Administration

Faculty structure
The university comprises twenty-one colleges and departments, sixty-five Undergraduate programs, eighty-six master's degree programs, twenty-six Doctorate Degree programs, one National Key lab, twelve Provincial Engineering Investigation Centers, and fifteen University Enterprise Engineering Investigation Centers.

The university has 15 academic disciplines of Provincial importance that form an academic system with its own distinctive qualities.

Staff
The university has 2309 faculty including 1570 full-time lecturers, 890 professors and associate professors and 130 doctoral tutors. The university has a total of 27599 full-time students among them 3878 graduate students.

Foreign exchange and international students

There are 279 international students at the university from 35 countries. The school has a developed exchange program where it offers 2+2 and 1+2+1 programs in collaboration with universities from overseas.

References

External links
Lanzhou University of Technology Official Website 

Universities and colleges in Gansu
Educational institutions established in 1919
Technical universities and colleges in China
1919 establishments in China